The Asia Museum of Modern Art (Taiwanese: A-tsiu Hiān-tāi Bí-su̍t-kuán) is an art museum in Wufeng District, Taichung, Taiwan. The museum is located at Asia University.

History
The groundbreaking ceremony for the museum construction was held on 24 January 2011. On 4 September 2013, the museum was officially named the Asia Museum of Modern Art or Asia Modern in short. After years of construction, the soft launch of the museum was held on 21 September 2013. The museum was officially opened on 24 October 2013 in a ceremony attended by President Ma Ying-jeou, Taichung Mayor Jason Hu.

Architecture
The museum was designed by architect Tadao Ando with a triangular shape of structure. The museum interior covers an area of 4,111 m2 with additional surrounding grounds measuring 19,840 m2. The museum building consists of three floors, which houses café, shop and lecture hall on the ground floor and art galleries on the upper and top most floor.

See also
 List of museums in Taiwan

References

External links

 

2013 establishments in Taiwan
Art museums and galleries in Taiwan
Art museums established in 2013
Museums in Taichung
University museums in Taiwan